Barber Benjamin Conable Jr. (November 2, 1922 – November 30, 2003) was a U.S. Congressman from New York and former President of the World Bank Group.

Biography
Conable was born in Warsaw, New York on November 2, 1922. Conable was an Eagle Scout and received the Distinguished Eagle Scout Award from the Boy Scouts of America.  He graduated from Cornell University in 1942, where he was president of the Quill and Dagger society and a member of the Phi Delta Theta fraternity. He then enlisted in the Marines and was sent to the Pacific front in World War II, where he learned to speak Japanese and fought in the Battle of Iwo Jima.  After the war, he received his law degree from Cornell University Law School in 1948, where he lived at the Cornell Branch of the Telluride Association, having been admitted to the House as a law student, after an unsuccessful attempt as an undergraduate.  He later re-enlisted and fought in the Korean War.

In 1962, Conable was elected as a Republican to the New York State Senate.  After only one term, he was elected to the U.S. House of Representatives in 1964 from a Rochester-based district.  He was reelected nine more times.  He was known on both sides of the aisle for his honesty and integrity, at one point being voted by his colleagues the "most respected" member of Congress; he refused to accept personal contributions larger than $50. As a longtime ranking minority member of the House Ways and Means Committee, one of his signal legislative achievements was a provision in the U.S. tax code that made so-called 401(k) and 403(b) defined-contribution retirement plans possible, and contributions to those plans by both employers and employees tax-deferred, under federal tax law.

A long-time ally of Richard Nixon, Conable broke with him in disgust after the revelations of the Watergate scandal. When the White House released a tape of Nixon instructing his Chief of Staff H. R. Haldeman to obstruct the FBI investigation, Conable said it was a "smoking gun", a phrase which quickly entered the political folklore.

In 1980, Conable appeared in Milton Friedman's PBS documentary Free to Choose.

Conable retired from the House in 1984. In 1986, President Ronald Reagan appointed him president of the World Bank. His experience as a legislator proved crucial as he persuaded his former colleagues to almost double Congress's appropriations for the bank. He retired in 1991.

In 1952, Conable married Charlotte Williams, his wife until his death. He died from a staphylococcus infection in 2003, at his winter home in Sarasota, Florida.

Literature by and about Conable
 Window on Congress: A Congressional Biography of Barber B. Conable Jr., James S. Fleming, Rochester, New York: University of Rochester Press, 2004, .
 The Conable Years at the World Bank: Major Policy Addresses of Barber B. Conable, 1986–91, Barber B. Conable Jr., Washington, D.C.: World Bank, 1991, .
 Congress and The Income Tax, Barber B. Conable Jr. and Arthur L. Singleton, Norman, Oklahoma: University of Oklahoma Press, 1989, .
 Controlling the Cost of Social Security: Held on June 25, 1981, and Sponsored by the American Enterprise Institute for Public Policy Research, Barber B. Conable Jr., John Charles, et al., Washington, D.C.: The Institute, 1981, .
 Foreign Assistance in a Time of Constraints, Barber B. Conable Jr., Richard S. Belous, S. Dahlia Stern, and Nita Christine Kent, eds., Washington, D.C.: National Planning Association, 1995, .
 Papers at Cornell University.

References

External links

 Conable's career at the World Bank
 
 Conable's obituary in the New York Times
 Conable's obituary in the Guardian
 Conable in the Biographical Directory of the United States Congress
 

|-

|-

|-

|-

|-

1922 births
2003 deaths
20th-century American politicians
United States Marine Corps personnel of World War II
United States Marine Corps personnel of the Korean War
Burials in New York (state)
Cornell Law School alumni
Deaths from staphylococcal infection
Infectious disease deaths in Florida
Republican Party New York (state) state senators
People from Warsaw, New York
Presidents of the World Bank Group
Republican Party members of the United States House of Representatives from New York (state)
United States Marines